Cumpăna is a commune in Constanța County, Northern Dobruja, Romania.

Administration
The commune includes the village with the same name, Cumpăna (historical name: Hașiduluc). The village was mentioned under the name Hașiduluc for the first time in 1870 by Ion Ionescu de la Brad in his work "Excursion agricole dans la plaine de la Dobroudja". It was renamed to Cumpăna in 1926.

Although still mentioned in the official documents as part of the Cumpăna commune, the village of Straja (historical name: Mahometcea) was abandoned to make way for the Danube-Black Sea Canal and its population moved to Cumpăna.

Demographics
At the 2011 census, Cumpăna had 10,732 Romanians (92.06%), 5  Hungarians (0.04%), 210 Roma  (1.80%), 7 Germans (0.06%), 510 Turks (4.37%), 168 Tatars (1.44%), 5 Lipovans (0.04%), 21 others (0.18%).

Latest developments
In the past few years, Cumpăna has become a favourite residential area for the people leaving the crowded city of Constanța. Recent developments like sewage, natural gas pipeline grid and proximity to new major hypermarkets accelerated that process. In Cumpăna there are two Orthodox churches, one of which was renovated in 2007, and one Pentecostal Christian church founded in 1991.

In 2007, Cumpăna was awarded the honorary title "European Village" by the European Union delegation in Romania.

Natives
 Marcel Toader

References

Communes in Constanța County
Localities in Northern Dobruja